Elise Ahonen (born in the 1960s) is a Finnish former competitive figure skater. She is a two-time Nordic medalist (1982 bronze, 1986 silver) and the 1985 Finnish national champion. She competed at ten ISU Championships; her best results included 10th at the 1983 World Junior Championships in Sarajevo, 14th at the 1985 European Championships in Gothenburg, and 15th at the 1985 World Championships in Tokyo. Her skating club was Helsingin taitoluisteluklubi in Helsinki.

Competitive highlights

References 

1960s births
Finnish female single skaters
Living people
Sportspeople from Helsinki
20th-century Finnish women